The Turks & Caicos Islands Amateur Athletic Association (TCIAAA) is the governing body for the sport of athletics in the Turks and Caicos Islands.  Current president is Edith Skippings.  She was elected in 2011.

History 
TCIAAA was founded in 1977 and was affiliated to the IAAF in 1978.

Affiliations 
TCIAAA is the national member federation for the Turks and Caicos Islands in the following international organisations:
International Association of Athletics Federations (IAAF)
North American, Central American and Caribbean Athletic Association (NACAC)
Association of Panamerican Athletics (APA)
Central American and Caribbean Athletic Confederation (CACAC)
Moreover, it is part of the following national organisations:
Turks & Caicos Islands Olympic Committee (TCIOC)
However, the TCIOC is not recognised by the IOC. After modifying its Charter in 1992, only Olympic Committees representing independent states are admitted as new IOC members.

National records 
TCIAAA maintains the Turks and Caicos Islands records in athletics.

References 

National members of the North American, Central American and Caribbean Athletic Association
Sports governing bodies in the Turks and Caicos Islands
Athletics in the Turks and Caicos Islands
National governing bodies for athletics
1977 establishments in the Turks and Caicos Islands
Sports organizations established in 1977